OutTV (stylized OUTtv) is a Canadian English language specialty channel that was launched in September 2001. It broadcasts general entertainment and lifestyle programming aimed at the LGBT community.

The network is owned by OUTtv Media Global Inc., majority owned (51%) by Ronald N. Stern through OM Acquisitions.

History

As PrideVision

The channel was launched on September 7, 2001 as PrideVision TV. Owned by Headline Media Group, it was Canada's first 24-hour cable television channel targeted at LGBT audiences. It was also the second LGBT-focused channel to be established in the world, after the Gay Cable Network in the U.S., which shut down in 2001.  PrideVision TV was one of 21 digital specialty services that were granted a Category 1 license by the Canadian Radio-television and Telecommunications Commission (CRTC) on November 24, 2000; all  digital cable and direct broadcast satellite providers would be obliged to carry the network in their lineup. Headline Media Group owned 70.1% of the licence, while Alliance Atlantis owned the remaining interest. In February 2001, before the channel was launched, Alliance Atlantis sold its entire interest in the licence to Headline Media Group, which became the sole owner of the licence.

The network launched with a lineup of lifestyle and general entertainment programming, consisting of dramas, comedies, feature films, documentaries and talk shows during the day and in prime time, as well as pornographic films nightly after 12:00 a.m. Eastern Time.

As PrideVision, the channel maintained a national advisory committee to provide input and feedback on the station's programming and its effectiveness at serving LGBT communities. The committee included businessman and activist Jim Deva, Outlooks publisher Roy Heale, Egale Canada executive director John Fisher, Suzanne Girard of Divers/Cité, Carmela Laurignano of Evanov Communications, Winnipeg mayor Glen Murray, Toronto city councillor Kyle Rae, Metropolitan Community Church of Toronto pastor Brent Hawkes, Ruby Hamilton of PFLAG and Halifax businesswoman Shelley Taylor.

Carriage difficulties 
PrideVision had considerable difficulty building an audience in its early years, due primarily to its pornographic programming: the network did not have a timeshift channel for the west coast, which led to PrideVision's adult content airing as early as 9:00 p.m. in the Pacific Time Zone. As such, the channel was marketed by many television providers as a standalone, premium service adult channel, rather than in a bundle with other specialty services, considerably reducing the number of potential subscribers. The channel also faced particular resistance from Shaw Cable, the largest cable television provider in Western Canada, which was accused of constraining the availability of PrideVision during the channel's first few months in operation. During a three-month long free preview period that was mandated by the CRTC to help launch the slate of new digital specialty channels that had launched at that time, Shaw customers who tuned to PrideVision were prompted with a screen and had to navigate through various others to ultimately come to the conclusion that they were to be charged a 1¢ fee to view the channel. This process would have to repeated every time a customer turned back to PrideVision, including the 1¢ fee. This process was not required for any other similarly licensed specialty channel. PrideVision took its concerns to the CRTC, who sided with the network and ordered Shaw to properly offer a free preview of PrideVision to its customers.

Mounting issues with distribution, disputes with television service providers, slow growth among digital channels as a whole among the industry, and faced with criticisms of providing a weak mix of programming, PrideVision was losing a considerable amount of money. The channel's subscriber base grew much more slowly than expected, with only roughly 20,000 subscribers by the end of 2002 compared to channels such as IFC, which had over 520,000 subscribers in the same time period. To help grow its subscriber base, PrideVision offered another free preview period to its distributors, and launched an advertising campaign comparing this business situation to impotency. Many in the gay community interpreted this as the company blaming them for the channel's problems, although the owners denied this. Despite this, PrideVision's subscriptions did increase slowly. In an effort to reduce its losses, staff at PrideVision were cut from 25 to 10, most of its original programming was dropped, and the street-level studio on Church Street in Toronto was closed in December 2002.

Sale, split, and re-launch as OutTV 

On December 3, 2003, Headline Media Group announced that it was selling a majority interest in PrideVision to 6166954 Canada, Inc., a consortium led by broadcaster William Craig. Craig would own the majority share in the company and act as managing partner, while Pink Triangle Press and various other independent production companies and investors held minority stakes. Headline Media retained a minority stake in the company. The transaction was finalized later in 2004.

In September 2004, 6166954 Canada submitted an application to the CRTC for a new premium service, which would be devoted to gay adult programming. In November, PrideVision expanded its adult programming—now branded as Hard on PrideVision—into primetime (from 9:00 p.m.-6:00 a.m. Eastern Time), in preparation for the expansion of the block into a 24-hour service, alongside a non-adult network tentatively named "Glow TV".

In February 2005, it was officially announced that PrideVision would drop its adult programming and re-launch as OutTV in March 2005, alongside the launch of the standalone Hard on PrideVision channel. Its license was approved on March 4, 2005. Craig explained that the removal of adult programming would make OutTV more attractive to television providers and improve its distribution, and the narrower focus would allow the two networks to expand their lineups with more programming of interest to the LGBT community.

Hard on PrideVision was expected to launch on April 7, 2005, but the launch was delayed to April 12 due to difficulties gaining carriage. Concurrently with the official launch of Hard, PrideVision was re-branded as OutTV, with a 24-hour lineup of general entertainment and lifestyle programming. Even with the launch of Hard and the removal of all adult content from the newly renamed OutTV, the channel was still facing resistance from Shaw Communications and its national satellite television service, Star Choice. Both distributors wanted to continue packaging OutTV as a standalone premium service rather than a general interest specialty channel, which most other major television providers had done. OutTV filed a complaint with the CRTC; however, the parties settled their disagreement before the matter was taken to a hearing before the CRTC and had agreed on a packaging deal. A similar deal was made with Bell later that year.

Acquisition by Shavick Entertainment

On July 19, 2006, Shavick Entertainment, a film and television producer based in Vancouver, British Columbia, announced it would acquire the majority interest in both OutTV and Hard on PrideVision from William Craig. Shavick also announced plans to rename OutTV, upgrade the technology infrastructure, and provide a wider variety of programming to the channel. Shavick listed its Hollywood-based partner Regent Studios, owners of American LGBT channel here!, as a major content provider to the channel.

In 2008, the channel ended its long-standing dispute with Shaw Cable, securing an agreement that would see the channel marketed and distributed in the same package as other Category A digital channels.

On December 3, 2009, the CRTC approved an application that would see HardTV sold and spun off into its own company, 4510810 Canada Inc., a company owned by Pink Triangle Press (55%) and Peace Point Entertainment (45%). The transaction closed at a later date.

On May 23, 2012, OutTV announced that it had passed 1 million subscribers, and would launch a high-definition feed on July 2, 2012. Concurrently, the network also introduced a new logo and refreshed on-air branding. The HD simulcast feed was launched on July 2, and the new website was launched on January 17, 2013.

In December 2012, Shavick Entertainment purchased Pink Triangle Press's 24.94% interest and Peace Point Entertainment Group's 15% interest in the channel.

Under Shavick's management, the channel has seen significant increases in its subscriber base, going from just 185,000 subscribers when they first purchased the channel to over 1.2 million today. The channel's improved ratings have been driven most significantly by the hit reality series RuPaul's Drag Race, although the channel has also seen ratings success with Sex & Violence, an original drama series created by Canadian film director Thom Fitzgerald. A nationwide free preview period in March 2014 saw the network achieve fully 300 per cent higher ratings than the same month in the previous year, and led to a rise in new subscriptions in the months following the preview.

In 2013, the channel applied to the CRTC to have its Canadian content commitment reduced from 49 to 35 per cent of revenues. According to chief operations officer Brad Danks, the library of viable LGBT-themed Canadian programming is limited enough that the channel has sometimes had to rely on repeat airings of programming from other networks, such as the talk shows 1 Girl 5 Gays and Steven & Chris, on "not obviously gay" programs such as The New Addams Family, and on overscheduling multiple airings of the same programming, to meet its licensing obligations.

OutTV is also a partner with Wolfe Video in GayDirect, a premium subscription channel for LGBT content on YouTube.

Acquisition by Ronald N. Stern

In November 2016, the CRTC approved the sale of the channel from Shavick Entertainment and the other minority owners to a new company, OM Acquisition. OM is owned and controlled by Ronald N. Stern, who is also president of Stern Partners, a conglomerate whose other holdings include a share in the Winnipeg Free Press. It was revealed through CRTC filings that the new owners intend to purchase additional channels, including international channels, and launch an online streaming service. Media reports revealed on January 11, 2017 noted that the agreement to purchase the channel closed in December 2016 and that the new owners of OUTtv will shift focus from the specialty channel to its online subscription service, OUTtvGO. Citing positive audience trends for adopting online television services and sagging cable subscription numbers, the television service is expected to close at a later date, however, the company revealed that the channel will remain on the air until at least 2020. The agreement was later modified to include minority owners, James Shavick (18%), Bradly Danks (18%), Phillip Webb (11%), and other minority owners at 2%.

Programming

OutTV's programming includes both original and acquired programming of LGBT-interest, including shows acquired from the U.S-based Logo TV and Here!.

The channel notably receives its highest ratings overall for the domestic airings of the RuPaul's Drag Race franchise. OutTV has also produced its own short series of weekly commentaries on several seasons of the main series, hosted by Richard Ryder in character as drag queen Wilma Fingerdoo. In June 2019, OutTV and Bell Media's Crave announced that they had co-commissioned a Canadian version of RuPaul's Drag Race. Canada's Drag Race was announced to be airing on both services, first premiering on Crave on July 2, 2020. As part of the deal, OutTV and Crave also share Canadian rights to the franchise, airing episodes of the U.S. and British version on their platforms day-and-date with their domestic premieres.

In recent years, the channel has reduced its reliance on acquired library programming and increased its investment in new original content, including both Canadian-based productions such as Cam Boy, Fak Yaass, Group Sext and Call Me Mother, and as a production partner in American content such as Jonny McGovern's talk show Hey Qween!, Ginger Minj's cooking show Wigs in a Blanket, Willam Belli's courtroom show Iconic Justice, and The Boulet Brothers' Dragula.

International distribution
In mid-2006, OutTV ventured into its first international market when it reached a deal with SelecTV to distribute the network on its lineup in Australia through a package called "CurveTV". However, in early 2007, OutTV and the CurveTV package was discontinued due to a low number of subscriptions.

On April 4, 2008, a European version of OutTV initially launched in the Netherlands through a licensing agreement with the newly formed Dutch company, OUTTV Media Group. In the years since the Dutch channel was launched, the channel had launched in several additional countries including Belgium, Switzerland, Germany, Spain, Sweden, Luxembourg, and Austria, while also launching in Israel through a similarly branded channel called PRIDEtv in 2019. Although the channel was initially launched through a licensing deal, it is unknown whether that relationship currently stands, as the programming and branding remain separate other than the name, and all references to each other's networks have been removed from each networks' respective websites.

In 2018, OUTtv expanded to New Zealand through a partnership with TVNZ on their OnDemand online platform.

OUTtv launched as a month long experimental pop-up channel, from October 4 to November 4, 2018, on MultiChoice's DStv in South Africa. In 2020, OUTtv signed a distribution deal with MultiChoice's Showmax where they'll distribute content to their streaming platform.

In 2020, the company launched an online streaming service in the U.K. and Ireland. called FROOTtv.

In March 2021, OUTtv Media Group partnered with Producer Entertainment Group (PEG) to launch the brand in the United States as an SVOD service with a different look and is currently available through Apple TV app in the market.

In November 2021, the channel launched in Australia as an Amazon Prime Video SVOD channel.

In November 2022, OUTtv announced that it will launch OUTtv Proud, a new free ad-supported streaming television channel in the US, in partnership with Fuse Media. The channel is expected to launch in 2023.

References

External links

OUTtvGo Website
OUTtv USA

English-language television stations in Canada
LGBT-related television channels
LGBT-related mass media in Canada
Digital cable television networks in Canada
Companies based in Vancouver
Television channels and stations established in 2001
2001 establishments in Canada